Hoy is an uninhabited island in Lake Constance in Germany. It lies 400 metres east of the island of Lindau in the Bay of Reutin and 100 metres south of the lakeshore near the mouth of the Oberreitnauer Ach (Lindauer Ach).

Geography

Description 
The island is roughly rectangular in shape, with a length of nine metres and a width of five to six metres. It covers an area of 53 m². The island of Hoy is part of the quarter and Gemarkung of Reutin in the borough of Lindau, which, until 1922, was an independent municipality. A willow tree dominates the tiny island, its crown covering most of the surface area. The shore of the island is enclosed by a wall, the top of which is 2 metres above the surface of the lake.

Nature reserve 
Hoy and the surrounding  Bay of Reutin (Reutiner Bucht) is designated as a  nature reserve. It has certain similarities with an artificial island in the lake of Chiemsee, the Schalch, which is also in Bavaria.

History 
According to locals, Hoy is occasionally (but incorrectly) called Galgeninsel ("Gallows Island"), but the real Galgeninsel, a former imperial execution site, lies 550 metres further east and has been a peninsula since the mid-19th century.

In reality, Hoy is a small artificial island, which was built by the then owner of the nearby Villa Seeheim (on the left, eastern bank of the Lindauer Ach river, opposite the town council offices). Construction was started on 20 February 1922 and, in 1934, the completion of the island was celebrated with the raising of a flag, singing and speeches.

The island was used in the years that followed as a private bathing island; it also had a bathing hut, which burned down in 1945.

Islands of Bavaria
Uninhabited islands of Germany
Islands of Lake Constance in Germany
Artificial islands of Europe
Lindau (district)